Annappanpettai is a village in the Papanasam taluk of Thanjavur district, Tamil Nadu, India.

Demographics 

As per the 2001 census, Annappanpettai had a total population of 1452 with 770 males and 772 females. The sex ratio was 1017. The literacy rate was 61.96.

References 

 

Villages in Thanjavur district